The Venezia Park Historic District is a U.S. historic district in Venice, Florida. It is bounded by Palermo Street, Sorrento Street, South Harbor Drive, and Salerno Street,  and contains 47 historic buildings. On December 18, 1989, it was added to the U.S. National Register of Historic Places.

Gallery

References

External links
 Sarasota County listings at National Register of Historic Places

National Register of Historic Places in Sarasota County, Florida
Historic districts on the National Register of Historic Places in Florida